Phenylsilane, also known as silylbenzene, a colorless liquid, is one of the simplest organosilanes with the formula C6H5SiH3.  It is structurally related to toluene, with a silyl group replacing the methyl group.  Both of these compounds have similar densities and boiling points due to these similarities.  Phenylsilane is soluble in organic solvents.

Synthesis and reactions
Phenylsilane is produced in two steps from Si(OEt)4.  In the first step, phenylmagnesium bromide is added to form Ph−Si(OEt)3 via a Grignard reaction. Reduction of the resulting Ph−Si(OEt)3 product with LiAlH4 affords phenylsilane.

Ph−MgBr + Si(OEt)4 → Ph−Si(OEt)3 + MgBr(OEt)

4 Ph−Si(OEt)3 + 3 LiAlH4 → 4 Ph−SiH3 + 3 LiAl(OEt)4

Uses
Phenylsilane can be used to reduce tertiary phosphine oxides to the corresponding tertiary phosphine.

P(CH3)3O + PhSiH3 → P(CH3)3 + PhSiH2OH

The use of phenylsilane proceeds with retention of configuration at the phosphine.  For example, cyclic chiral tertiary phosphine oxides can be reduced to cyclic tertiary phosphines.

Phenylsilane combines with caesium fluoride to give the ate complex [PhSiFH3]−.  This species functions as a hydride donor, reducing 4-oxazolium salts to 4-oxazolines.

References

Carbosilanes
Phenyl compounds